Xacti is a brand of Sanyo hybrid digital camera and camcorder.  They use a distinct pistol-shaped format with most controls operated by the thumb and able to shoot both video and picture simultaneously.  The range of models includes high definition cameras, waterproof cameras and cameras using the H.264 video codec. SANYO DI Solutions Co., Ltd. changed its name to Xacti Corporation in May 2013.

List of Xacti models

CA100
CG102
CG100
TH1
SH1 
FH1
WH1
HD2000
HD1010
HD1000
HD800
HD700
HD2
HD1a
HD1
C40
CA9
CA8
CA65/E1
CA6
CG65
CG21
CG20
CG10
CG9
CG6
C6
C5
C4
C1
VPC-E1

References

External links 

Sanyo products
Japanese brands